G Magazine was a Brazilian gay men's magazine that featured frontal nudity (including erections) and articles for the gay community, created by Ana Fadigas. It was a monthly publication that sold approximately 180,000 issues every month, about half of Playboy. Its online version was G Online.

The magazine featured nude photographs of dozens of Brazilian celebrities as well as foreign celebrities, such as Warren Cuccurullo, guitarist for Duran Duran. Among these Brazilian celebrities are actors Alexandre Frota, Matheus Carrieri and Victor Wagner, model Klaus Hee, DJs, singers Rodrigo Phavanello, Márcio Aguiar and David Cardoso Junior as well as footballers of the national team and other professional teams and contestants of the Brazilian version of Big Brother and other reality shows.

List of cover models
The following is a list of magazine cover models:

1997

1998

1999

2000

2001

2002

2003

2004

2005

2006

2007

2008

2009

2010

2011

2012

2013

External links
  
 All issues of G Magazine

1997 establishments in Brazil
2013 disestablishments in Brazil
Defunct magazines published in Brazil
Gay male pornographic magazines
LGBT-related mass media in Brazil
LGBT-related magazines
Magazines disestablished in 2013
Magazines established in 1997
Magazines published in Brazil
Monthly magazines published in Brazil
Portuguese-language magazines